Closer is a 2004 American romantic drama film directed and produced by Mike Nichols and written by Patrick Marber, based on the award-winning 1997 play of the same name. It stars Julia Roberts, Jude Law, Natalie Portman, and Clive Owen. The film, like the play on which it is based, has been seen by some as a modern and tragic version of Wolfgang Amadeus Mozart's 1790 opera Così fan tutte, with references to the opera in both the plot and the soundtrack. Owen starred in the play as Dan, the role played by Law in the film.

The film received positive reviews and grossed $115 million at the box office. It was recognized with a number of awards and nominations, including Oscar nominations and Golden Globe wins for both Portman and Owen for their performances in supporting roles.

Plot
During a busy morning in London, writer Dan Woolf meets a beautiful American woman after she is hit by a car, not used to the direction of traffic in England. On their walk back from the hospital, they stop by Postman's Park. Dan asks her name, which she gives as Alice Ayres. They soon become lovers.

A year later, Dan has written a novel based on Alice's life. While being photographed to publicise it, he flirts with the American photographer Anna Cameron. They share a kiss before Alice arrives. While she uses the bathroom, Dan tries to persuade Anna to have an affair with him but their conversation is cut short by Alice's return. Alice then asks Anna if she can have her portrait taken as well. Anna agrees, and Alice asks Dan to leave them alone during the photoshoot. While being photographed, she reveals to Anna that she overheard them, and she is photographed while crying. Alice doesn't tell Dan what she heard and their relationship continues, but Dan spends a year brooding over his interest in Anna.

Another year later, Dan enters a cybersex chat room and converses with Larry Gray, a British dermatologist. With Anna still on his mind, Dan pretends to be her, and invites Larry to meet at the aquarium, where Anna told Dan she often went. Larry goes to the rendezvous, where he by chance meets Anna and learns that he is the victim of a prank. Anna tells Larry that Dan was most likely to blame for the setup. Soon, Anna and Larry become a couple.

Four months later at Anna's photo exhibition, Larry meets Alice, whom he recognises from the photograph of her in tears, which is being exhibited. Larry knows that Alice and Dan are a couple from talking to Anna. Dan persuades Anna to become involved with him. They cheat on their respective lovers for a year, even though Anna and Larry marry halfway through the year. Eventually Anna and Dan each confess the affair to their respective partners, leaving their relationships for one another.

Heartbroken by her loss, Alice becomes a stripper once again. One day, Larry runs into her accidentally at the strip club. He asks her real name, and she tells him it is Jane Jones. He asks her to have sex with him, but she refuses. Later, Larry and Anna meet for coffee. She asks him to sign their divorce papers, and he bargains with her- she agrees to sleep with him so that he will sign the documents and thereafter leave her alone. Anna and Dan later meet and, after she reveals to him that the divorce papers have been signed, Dan realizes she has had sex with Larry. She claims she did it so he would leave them alone, but Dan is furious and does not trust her.

A distraught Dan later confronts Larry to try to get Anna back. Larry tells him Anna never filed the signed divorce papers and suggests that he return to Alice. Alice takes Dan back and they plan a visit to the United States for a vacation. While in a hotel room at Gatwick Airport celebrating being back together, they talk about the way they met. After bringing up Larry, Dan asks her whether she had sex with him. She initially denies it but a short while later, she says she doesn't love him anymore and that she did sleep with Larry. Dan forgives her but Alice insists that it's over and tells him to leave. The argument culminates in Dan slapping Alice.

At the conclusion of the film, Larry and Anna are together, and Alice returns to New York City alone. As she passes through the immigration checkpoint on her way back into the States, a shot of her passport shows her real name to be Jane Jones, revealing she had lied about her name during her entire four-year relationship with Dan but had told the truth to Larry, even though he didn't believe her.  Back in London, Dan returns to Postman's Park and notices the name Alice Ayres on the tiles of the Memorial to Heroic Self-Sacrifice. The Ayres dedication is to a young woman, "who by intrepid conduct" and "at the cost of her own young life," rescued three children from a fire.

The final scene, which resembles the first, shows Jane walking on a New York street alone being stared at by several of the men around her. She crosses a crosswalk that appears to have a "Don't Walk" signal up.

Cast
 Julia Roberts as Anna Cameron
 Natalie Portman as Alice Ayres / Jane Jones
 Jude Law as Daniel "Dan" Woolf
 Clive Owen as Larry Gray
 Nick Hobbs as Taxi Driver
 Colin Stinton as Customs Officer

Production

Filming
Closer was filmed at Elstree Film and Television Studios and on location in London.

Music
The main theme of the film follows Mozart's opera Così fan tutte, with references to that opera in both the plot and the soundtrack. One of the pivotal scenes develops to the background of the overture to Rossini's opera La Cenerentola ("Cinderella"). The soundtrack also contains songs from Jem, Damien Rice and Lisa Hannigan, Bebel Gilberto, the Devlins, the Prodigy and the Smiths.

The music of Irish folk singer Damien Rice is featured in the film, most notably the song "The Blower's Daughter," whose lyrics has parallels to many of the themes in the film. The opening notes from Rice's song "Cold Water" are also used repeatedly, notably in the memorial park scenes. Rice wrote a song titled "Closer" which was intended for use in the film but was not completed in time.

Reception

Critical reaction
The review aggregator website Rotten Tomatoes gives the film an approval score of 68% based on 212 reviews, and an average rating of 6.60/10. The website's critical consensus states, "Closer'''s talented cast and Mike Nichols' typically assured direction help smooth a bumpy journey from stage to screen." Another review aggregator, Metacritic, shows a weighted average score of 65 out of 100, based on 42 reviews, indicating "generally favorable reviews".

Roger Ebert, writing for the Chicago Sun-Times, said of the people involved with the film, "[t]hey are all so very articulate, which is refreshing in a time when literate and evocative speech has been devalued in the movies." Peter Travers, writing for Rolling Stone, said, "Mike Nichols' haunting, hypnotic Closer vibrates with eroticism, bruising laughs and dynamite performances from four attractive actors doing decidedly unattractive things." Kenneth Turan of the Los Angeles Times wrote, "[d]espite involved acting and Nichols' impeccable professionalism as a director, the end result is, to quote one of the characters, 'a bunch of sad strangers photographed beautifully'." The New York Times A. O. Scott wrote, "[u]nlike most movie love stories, Closer does have the virtue of unpredictability. The problem is that, while parts are provocative and forceful, the film as a whole collapses into a welter of misplaced intensity." In a review on The Atlantic website, Christoper Orr described the film as "flamboyantly bad" and "irretrievably silly, a potty-mouthed fantasy that somehow mistakes itself for a fearless excavation of the dark recesses of the human soul", suggesting that what might have worked on stage came across as "ostentatious melodrama" on film. 

In a review from Allmovie, Perry Seibert praised the acting, the direction and the screenwriting, stating that Clive Owen "finds every dimension in his alpha-male character", Julia Roberts "shows not an ounce of movie-star self-consciousness", Natalie Portman "understands [her character] inside and out" and affirming that "[w]ith his superior timing, Nichols allows each of these actors to hit every funny, cruel, and intimate moment in the script". The Guardian's Peter Bradshaw gave Closer a one-star review and stated that Clive Owen was the only actor that portrayed "real emotions" in the film, saying that the other three lead actors could have just been "advertising perfume". Closer was featured on 73 end-of-the-year "Top Ten" lists by North American critics, gaining the first place position on two of these lists.

Box office
The film was released on December 3, 2004 in North America. Closer opened in 476 theaters, but the theater count was increased after the film was released. The film was domestically a moderate financial success, grossing $33,987,757. Huge success followed in the international market, where the film grossed an additional $81,517,270; over 70% of its $115,505,027 worldwide gross. The film was produced on a budget of US$27 million.

Awards and nominations 

Home mediaCloser'' was first released on VHS and DVD on March 29, 2005 and on Blu-ray on May 22, 2007.

References

External links

 
 
 
 
 
 

2004 films
2004 independent films
2004 romantic drama films
2000s American films
2000s English-language films
2000s erotic drama films
American erotic drama films
American erotic romance films
American films based on plays
American independent films
American nonlinear narrative films
American romantic drama films
BAFTA winners (films)
Columbia Pictures films
Films about infidelity
Films about striptease
Films about writers
Films about photographers
Films directed by Mike Nichols
Films shot at Elstree Film Studios
Films set in London
Films featuring a Best Supporting Actor Golden Globe winning performance
Films featuring a Best Supporting Actress Golden Globe-winning performance